Rand & Holland is the project for Sydney musician Brett Thompson.

In 2003 the group released its debut album, Tomorrow Will Be Like Today, on the Sydney-based label Preservation, and it has since been released in Germany on Staubgold.

In 2007, the band followed up this album with the release Caravans.

References

http://www.discogs.com/artist/Rand+And+Holland
http://www.staubgold.com/en/album/75/tomorrow-will-be-like-today/?PHPSESSID=3bad029de966c43b1facfc08af9fe6e7

New South Wales musical groups